Amity University, Jaipur, Rajasthan was established under Amity University Rajasthan Act 2008, and is a government-recognized University with the right to confer degrees as per Sections 2f and 22(1) of the University Grants Commission Act.

Recognition and accreditation
Amity University, Jaipur was established by the Government Act of 2008 of Government of Rajasthan. It is a private university established by the Ritnand Balved Education Foundation, New Delhi, a society registered under the Societies Registration Act, 1860.

Academics
The university offers programs in the fields of management, engineering, biotechnology, applied sciences, forensic science, environment, journalism and mass communications, liberal arts, computer science, foreign language, law, architecture, commerce, economics, fashion, fine arts, and hotel management both at undergraduate and post-graduate levels, besides offering doctoral degrees in several of those disciplines

References

External links 
 Official Website

Private universities in India
Universities and colleges in Jaipur
Universities in Rajasthan
2008 establishments in Rajasthan
Educational institutions established in 2008